Tapena thwaitesi, the black angle, is a species of butterfly belonging to the family Hesperiidae found in Indomalayan realm. The species was described by Frederic Moore in 1881 and is named after G. H. K. Thwaites, the director of the botanical garden at Peradeniya, Sri Lanka between 1849 and 1880.

Description
Male has the upperside dark purple brown, with blackish outer margins and indistinct discal transverse band of spots; forewing with two small translucent white spots on the costa near the apex. Underside dark purple brown.

Female has the upper and underside greyish purple brown, transverse band of spots and outer border dark purple brown; forewing with three small semi-diaphanous white subapical spots, the lowest transversely narrow, two spots also at end of the cell, the upper one very slender, and two spots on the disc, each series being bordered by the dark band; hindwing with a semi-diaphanous spot at end of the cell.

Subspecies
Two subspecies are classified under Tapena thwaitesi, they are:
T. t. bornea Evans, 1941 - southern Vietnam, Thailand, Langkawi, Malay Peninsula, Borneo, Sumatra, Palawan
T. t. minuscula Elwes & Edwards, 1897 - Myanmar, Thailand, Laos

Gallery

References

Tagiadini
Butterflies of Asia
Butterflies of Singapore
Butterflies of Indochina
Taxa named by Frederic Moore